Lygniodes schoenbergi is a moth of the family Erebidae. It is found on Borneo. The habitat mainly consists of lowland forests, particularly alluvial forests.

References

External links
Moths of Borneo

Moths described in 1890
Lygniodes